Actin-related protein 2/3 complex subunit 4 is a protein that in humans is encoded by the ARPC4 gene.

Function 

This gene encodes one of seven subunits of the human Arp2/3 protein complex. The Arp2/3 protein complex has been implicated in the control of actin polymerization in cells and has been conserved through evolution. The exact role of the protein encoded by this gene, the p20 subunit, has yet to be determined. Three transcript variants encoding two distinct isoforms have been found for this gene.

Model organisms

Model organisms have been used in the study of ARPC4 function. A conditional knockout mouse line, called Arpc4tm1a(EUCOMM)Wtsi was generated as part of the International Knockout Mouse Consortium program — a high-throughput mutagenesis project to generate and distribute animal models of disease to interested scientists.

Male and female animals underwent a standardized phenotypic screen to determine the effects of deletion. Twenty six tests were carried out on mutant mice and two significant abnormalities were observed.  No homozygous mutant embryos were identified during gestation, and therefore none survived until weaning. The remaining tests were carried out on heterozygous mutant adult mice; no additional significant abnormalities were observed in these animals.

Interactions 

ARPC4 has been shown to interact with ARPC5.

References

Further reading

External links 
 

Genes mutated in mice